Neoclinus stephensae, the Yellowfin fringehead, is a species of chaenopsid blenny found in the eastern Pacific ocean. It can reach a maximum length of  TL. The specific name honours the collector of the type, the British-American conchologist Kate Stephens (ca. 1853–1954) who was Curator of Mollusks and Marine Invertebrates at San Diego Natural History Museum and who was over 100 years old at the time the species was described.

References
 Hubbs, Clark, 1953 (26 Feb.) Revision and systematic position of the blenniid fishes of the genus Neoclinus. Copeia 1953 (no. 1): 11–23.

stephensae
Fish described in 1953
Taxa named by Clark Hubbs